This is a comprehensive listing of official releases by Elvis Crespo, a Puerto Rican Merengue singer. Elvis Crespo has released 10 studio albums, 19 singles, and many music videos in the record label Sony BMG.

Albums

Studio albums

Compilation albums

Live albums

Singles

Guest singles

Awards

This is a list of awards and nominations of Puerto Rican Merengue artist Elvis Crespo. Here are some of the awards he has won during his musical career.

Premio Lo Nuestro
1999

Tropical: Album of the Year (Suavemente)
Tropical: Male Artist of the Year
Tropical: Best New Artist
Tropical: Song of the Year (Suavemente)
2000
Tropical: Album of the Year (Pintame)
Tropical: Male Artist of the Year
Tropical: Song of the Year (Pintame)
2001
Merengue: Artist of the Year
People Choice Awards: Tropical Artist of the Year
2003
Merengue: Artist of the Year
2005
Merengue: Artist of the Year

Grammy Awards
1999 
Best Merengue Performance (Pintame)

Latin Grammys
2005
Best Merengue Album (Saborealo)

References

 
Creso, Elvis
Tropical music discographies